Citadella is the fortification located upon the top of Gellért Hill in Budapest, Hungary.

Citadella, the Italian word for citadel (meaning a castle, fortress, or fortified center), may also refer to:

Fortifications
Cittadella (Gozo), a walled city in Victoria, Gozo, Malta
Cittadella, a medieval walled city in the province of Padua, Italy
Cittadella of Alessandria, a star fort in Alessandria, Italy
Cittadella Nuova, a fortress in Pisa, Italy
Real Cittadella, a star fort in Messina, Sicily, Italy

People
Baldassare Cittadella, an Italian missionary

Other uses
A.S. Cittadella, an Italian football club
Cittadella (Bari) railway station, a railway station in Bari, Italy
La Cittadella (1964 miniseries), an Italian miniseries

See also
Citadel (disambiguation)
Citadelle (disambiguation)
The Citadel (disambiguation)